Arogalea is a genus of moths in the family Gelechiidae.

Species
Arogalea albilingua Walsingham, 1911
Arogalea archaea Walsingham, 1911
Arogalea cristifasciella (Chambers, 1878)
Arogalea crocipunctella (Walsingham, [1892])
Arogalea melitoptila (Meyrick, 1923)
Arogalea senecta Walsingham, 1911
Arogalea soronella Busck, 1914

Former species
Arogalea senariella (Zeller, 1877)

References

 
Litini
Moth genera